Eleuterio Mancebo (born 4 December 1968) is a Spanish former cyclist. He competed in two events at the 1992 Summer Olympics.

References

External links
 

1968 births
Living people
Spanish male cyclists
Olympic cyclists of Spain
Cyclists at the 1992 Summer Olympics
People from Vall d'Albaida
Sportspeople from the Province of Valencia
Cyclists from the Valencian Community